Bob Stephenson (born February 1, 1954) is a Canadian politician and former professional ice hockey right winger.

Early life 
Stephenson was born in Saskatoon, Saskatchewan. He was a member of the St. Francis Xavier X-Men at St. Francis Xavier University before turning professional.

Career 
Stephenson played in both the National Hockey League and World Hockey Association between 1977 and 1980. He served as the mayor of Outlook, Saskatchewan, from 1998 to 2016.

Personal life 
Stephenson is the father of Shay Stephenson and Logan Stephenson and the first cousin once removed of Chandler Stephenson as Stephenson and Chandler's father Curt Stephenson are first cousins.

Career statistics

Regular season and playoffs

External links

1954 births
Living people
Birmingham Bulls players
Canadian expatriate ice hockey players in the United States
Canadian ice hockey right wingers
Flint Generals players
Hampton Gulls (AHL) players
Hartford Whalers players
Ice hockey people from Saskatchewan
New Brunswick Hawks players
St. Francis Xavier X-Men ice hockey players
Sportspeople from Saskatoon
Springfield Indians players
Toronto Maple Leafs players
Tulsa Oilers (1964–1984) players
Undrafted National Hockey League players